Miodrag Ješić (30 November 1958 – 8 December 2022) was a Serbian football manager and player.

Playing career
Born in Osečenica, Ješić played for Partizan between 1974 and 1985, taking part in 342 matches and scoring 81 goals in all competitions.

Between 1985 and 1989 he represented Altay SK, where he recorded 136 matches and 29 goals, and finished his career at Trabzonspor in 1989–90 with 37 matches and 9 goals in total.

Ješić was immensely disliked amongst the Fenerbahçe supporters because they viewed him as responsible for an injury suffered by Rıdvan Dilmen in 1990 during a league match between Fenerbahçe and Trabzonspor. Dilmen never fully recovered despite undergoing sixteen operations, and eventually had to retire in 1995 at Fenerbahçe after painful years of injuries. Ješić had also accumulated a record number of bookings in his tenure in Süper Lig. Opponents claimed that he also injured many players in Turkey and gave him the nickname of "Kasap Yeşiç", which means "Ješić the Butcher."

For the Yugoslavia national team, he played in eight games and scored twice.

Coaching career
As a manager, Ješić began his career at FK Obilić in 1993, reaching a Yugoslav Cup final, and then managed several other Serbian teams, including OFK Beograd and his native Partizan, that, during his period at the helm, scored 111 goals in a single season, a club record. He also recorded wins over Flora (6–0, 4–1) and Rijeka (3–1, 3–0) in UEFA Champions League qualifiers.

After coaching Tunisian side CS Sfaxien in 2000–01 and winning the Arab Champions League, he was at the helm of Turkish club Altay in 2002 and moved to Bulgaria in 2002 to manage Slavia Sofia and then Iranian Pegah Gilan, after which he became the manager of CSKA Sofia. During this period he became a Champion of Bulgaria and recorded a win over Liverpool in the UEFA Champions League qualifying phase, also eliminating Bayer Leverkusen in the UEFA Cup. Voted coach no. 1 for season 2004–05 by Bulgarian sport newspaper.

In May 2006 he became the coach of Partizan for the second time in his coaching career. However, following a disappointing first half of the season, he left the club in January 2007. Since November 2007 he was coaching Litex Lovech. With him Litex won the Bulgarian Cup.

In June 2008, he signed with Romanian Liga I newcomers CS Otopeni and following a series of defeats his agreement was terminated early on 18 August 2008.

In September 2008, he signed a one-year contract with Montenegrin First League team FK Budućnost Podgorica.

In July 2009, he signed a one-year contract with Libyan First League team Al-Ittihad Tripoli. On 22 September 2009, Al Ittihad won the Libyan Super Cup, beating Tarsana 3–2.

On 16 June 2010, Ješić was appointed to the manager of Changsha Ginde replacing Hao Wei.

On 19 June 2011, he was named as Shahrdari Tabriz F.C.'s new head coach replacing Hamid Derakhshan but he was sacked by the club on 24 December 2011.

On 24 June 2012, he was named as Saudi Professional League side Najran's new head coach. On 7 January 2013, Ješić was reappointed  CSKA Sofia manager, replacing Stoycho Mladenov, but was surprisingly released from his duties on 11 March 2013, after just two games in charge of the team, one of which was won.

In late 2013, he was close to becoming the new Vancouver Whitecaps FC head coach.

On 31 March 2014 Ješić was appointed head coach of Litex Lovech and was assisted by Darko Obradović.

On 14 June 2017, he was named as Saudi Professional League side Al-Ettifaq's coach. He was fired on 10 December 2017.

On 31 August 2019, the Egyptian club Ismaily SC appointed Ješić as the team's new head coach, succeeding Mahmoud Gaber.

On 7 July 2022, Saudi First Division League side Al-Shoulla appointed Ješić as the team's new manager. On 29 September 2022, he was sacked after five matches.

Personal life and death
Ješić was married to Irena, with whom he had a daughter named Tara. In 2001, while coaching CS Sfaxien, his daughter Jelena died in a traffic collision at the age of nineteen.

Ješić, aged 64, died on 8 December 2022 in a car accident near the town of Ruma.

Career statistics

Managerial statistics

Honors

Player
Partizan
Yugoslav First League: 1982–83

Manager
CS Sfaxien
Arab Champions League: 2000
CSKA Sofia
Bulgarian First League: 2004–05
Bulgarian Cup: 2006
Litex Lovech
Bulgarian Cup: 2008
Bulgarian Supercup: 2007, 2008
Al-Ittihad Tripoli
Libyan Premier League: 2008–09, 2009–10
Libyan Cup: 2009
Libyan Super Cup: 2009, 2010
Yangon United
Myanmar National League: 2015

References

External links

 Official website
 
 

1958 births
2022 deaths
People from Mionica
Serbian footballers
Yugoslav footballers
Yugoslavia international footballers
Association football defenders
Association football midfielders
FK Partizan players
Yugoslav First League players
Altay S.K. footballers
Trabzonspor footballers
Süper Lig players
Expatriate footballers in Turkey
Serbian expatriate footballers
Serbian expatriate sportspeople in Libya
Serbian football managers
FK Partizan managers
CS Sfaxien managers
FK Radnički Niš managers
OFK Beograd managers
PFC CSKA Sofia managers
PFC Slavia Sofia managers
PFC Litex Lovech managers
Expatriate football managers in Bulgaria
FK Budućnost Podgorica managers
Expatriate football managers in Montenegro
Guangzhou City F.C. managers
Expatriate football managers in China
Najran SC managers
Expatriate football managers in Saudi Arabia
FK Sarajevo managers
Ettifaq FC managers
Expatriate football managers in Bosnia and Herzegovina
Expatriate football managers in Turkey
Expatriate football managers in Iran
Expatriate football managers in Tunisia
Expatriate football managers in Romania
Serbian expatriate sportspeople in Saudi Arabia
Saudi Professional League managers
Al-Arabi SC (Kuwait) managers
Serbian expatriate sportspeople in Kuwait
Expatriate football managers in Kuwait
Kuwait Premier League managers
Serbian expatriate sportspeople in Romania
Serbian expatriate sportspeople in Iran
Serbian expatriate sportspeople in Tunisia
Serbian expatriate sportspeople in Turkey
Serbian expatriate sportspeople in Bosnia and Herzegovina
Serbian expatriate sportspeople in Bulgaria
Serbian expatriate sportspeople in Montenegro
Serbian expatriate sportspeople in China
Serbian expatriate football managers
Ismaily SC managers
Serbian expatriate sportspeople in Egypt
Expatriate football managers in Egypt
Tunisian Ligue Professionnelle 1 managers
Persian Gulf Pro League managers
Al-Shoulla FC managers
Saudi First Division League managers
Road incident deaths in Serbia